Wellington Country Park is a country park in Riseley, near Reading.

Overview 
The park is the ultimate adventure for 3-8 year olds with all attractions being aimed for this target age group including adventure playgrounds, mini-golf, an animal farm, miniature railway, jumping pillow, and more.

It was opened in 1974 by the 8th Duke and Duchess of Wellington.

The park also has a campsite which has sole use of the children's play area facilities when the park itself closes.

References

External links
Official site

Country parks in Hampshire
Tourist attractions in Hampshire